Battleheart Legacy is an action RPG developed by Mika Mobile, Inc. and released on May 28, 2014. It is the follow-up to the 2011 game Battleheart. In 2018, a sequel to Battleheart was released: Battleheart 2.

Reception

Battleheart Legacy received "generally favorable reviews" according to the review aggregator Metacritic, with a score of 88 out of 100 based on 12 critic reviews.

References

2014 video games
Android (operating system) games
IOS games
Action role-playing video games
Video games developed in the United States